South Carleton High School is a high school situated in the southwestern sector of the city of Ottawa, in the town of Richmond, Ontario. The school is under the jurisdiction of the Ottawa-Carleton District School Board. The SCHS attendance boundaries cover a major section of the southern part of the Ottawa-Carleton District School Board. Students come from all over the southwestern sector of the city but mainly from the communities of Stittsville, Manotick, Richmond, Riverside South, North Gower, Munster, Kars, Fallowfield, Ashton, Burritts Rapids and the area connecting these communities. SCHS feeder schools include Goulbourn Middle School, Kars on the Rideau Public School, and A. Lorne Cassidy Elementary School.

The school opened in 1952 to 263 students and 13 teachers under the leadership of its first principal, W.W. Powell. 
South Carleton's 60th anniversary was celebrated in 2012.

Athletics

South Carleton has a wide range of athletic activities.

The Alpine ski team has won 8 OFSAA titles to date, including the boys' team with 2 (GS, Sl) in 2002 as well as 2008(Sl), 2009(Sl) and 2015 (GS) and their first girls' team title in 2012 (Sl) with followups in 2014 (Sl) and 2015 (Sl). It has sent a total of 24 teams to OFSAA who once there have collected a grand total of 29 team and 14 individual medals since 1999. The level 1 boys team has won 9 consecutive NCSSAA titles with the boys and girls together winning the Art Lovett level 1 combined trophy  11 straight times.

Its wrestling program has won the NCSSAA championship for the past several years and produces nearly a dozen OFSAA wrestlers each year. This has led to the coining of the term "wrestle with the best".

The Senior Men's Rugby team was undefeated in regular season in 2007 and 2008, including a 2008 NCSSAA championship win.

South Carleton's varsity swim team was formed during the 2010–11 season, and won two NCSSAA medals, both of which were gold, sending one swimmer to OFSAA. In the 2011–12 season once again one swimmer qualified for OFSAA, winning a bronze medal for SC.

The Storm basketball team has won several city titles in its history, including the most recent visit to the NCSSAA championship in the 2008–09 season.

The South Carleton Junior Boys' soccer team captured the 2008 NCSSAA Gold Medal after an undefeated season.

The Senior Boys' Soccer team won the 2016 NCSSAA final and qualified for OFSAA.

South Carleton's football team had reached the NCSSAA finals in 2006 and 2008, losing both times, and lost in the NCSSAA semi-finals in 2007.

The baseball team captured their 3rd NCSSAA tier 2 title in 4 years in 2012 and have won 4 titles (including a Tier 1 title in 2004) in their 10-year history. In 2013, the team moved back to the OFSAA tier and were undefeated in seasonal play before bowing out in the quarterfinals.

Arts
South Carleton High School is home to one of the largest arts programs in the OCDSB. All attending students have the opportunity to enroll in Visual Arts, Music, Dance, Drama, and Media Studies.

Dance Shows
The annual dance show is the institution's largest arts display, typically attracting a cumulative 500-600+ audience.

The Fall 2016 Dance Performance was dedicated in honour of Prince under the name of "Tribute to Broadway," and the Spring 2017 Show paid tribute to the 150th anniversary of Canadian Confederation. The Fall 2017 Show honoured Pink, and the Spring 2018 Show paid homage to the town of Richmond's 200th anniversary of foundation.

Bob Erwin Football Field
On October 6, 2005, during half-time at the Senior Football game, the South Carleton Football Field was dedicated to Bob Erwin, teacher and coach at South Carleton for 33 years.

See also
List of high schools in Ontario

References 

High schools in Ottawa
Educational institutions established in 1952
1952 establishments in Ontario